Maurice Beddow Bayly  (26 March 1887 – 22 June 1961) was an English physician, anti-vivisection activist, and anti-vaccination campaigner.

Biography

Bayly was born in Woolwich. He was educated at St Dunstan's College, London University and Charing Cross Hospital. He was one of the few prominent doctors advocating anti-vivisection in the post-war period.

He was a member of the National Anti-Vaccination League, the Animal Defence and Anti-Vivisection Society, and the English section of the Theosophical Society.

Selected publications

 The Schick Inoculation Against Diphtheria (1927)
 Cancer the Failure of Modern Research: A Survey (1936)
 The Case AGAINST Vaccination (1936)
 Diet in Relation to Health and Disease (1937)
 The Taxpayer and Experiments on Living Animals: With Special Reference to the Work of the Medical Research Council (1938)
 Inoculation Against Typhoid Fever - A Criticism of its Value and Scientific Basis (1941)
 Spotlights on Vivisection (1946)
 B.C.G. Vaccination (1952)
 The Futility of Experiments on Animals (1956)
 The Story of the Salk Anti-Poliomyelitis Vaccine (1958)
 More Spotlights on Vivisection (1960)
 Clinical Medical Discoveries (1961)
 Vivisection: The Futility of Experiments on Living Animals (1962)

See also
 List of vaccine topics
 Vaccine controversy

References

External links
 HomeoInt.org - 'Anaemia and Pernicious Anaemia', M. Beddow Bayly, Medical World (December 15, 1933)
 HomeoInt.org - 'Some Little-Understood Effects of Serum Therapy', M. Beddow Bayly, Medical World'' (April 6, 1934)
 WebInquirer.plus.com - 'The Story of the Salk Anti-Poliomyelitis Vaccine', M. Beddow Bayly (1956)

1887 births
1961 deaths
Anti-vivisectionists
British anti-vaccination activists
English medical writers
English Theosophists
People from Woolwich